Malcolm Wayne (Mal) Eason (March 13, 1879 – April 16, 1970) was a starting pitcher in Major League Baseball who played for the Chicago Orphans (1900–1902), Boston Beaneaters (1902), Detroit Tigers (1903) and Brooklyn Superbas (1905–1906). Eason batted and threw right-handed. He was born in Brookville, Pennsylvania.

Playing career
In 1901 and 1902, Eason finished with marks of 8–17 and 10–12, while pitching for second-division teams. Despite these losing records, he registered 3.59 and 2.61 ERAs respectively. His most productive season came in 1906, when he posted a 10–17 mark with a 3.25 ERA. It was Eason's last season as an active player. That July 20, Eason no-hit the St. Louis Cardinals 2–0. Earlier in the season, he had been the losing pitcher in the previous no-hitter to this one, by the Philadelphia Phillies' Johnny Lush on May 1. Not until Bill McCahan in 1947 would another pitcher hurl a no-hitter after being on the losing end of the last no-hitter before the one he posted.

In a six-season career, Eason posted a 36–73 record with 274 strikeouts and a 3.42 ERA in  innings pitched. He completed 90 of 114 starts, including ten shutouts.

Umpiring career
Eason is recorded as having umpired three games in 1902.

Death
Eason died in a house fire in Douglas, Arizona, at the age of 91.

See also
 List of Major League Baseball no-hitters

External links

Baseball Almanac
Baseball Library
Retrosheet

Boston Beaneaters players
Brooklyn Superbas players
Chicago Orphans players
Detroit Tigers players
Major League Baseball pitchers
Baseball players from Pennsylvania
1879 births
1970 deaths
Grove City Wolverines baseball players
Accidental deaths in Arizona
Minor league baseball managers
Auburn Maroons players
Troy Trojans (minor league) players
Syracuse Stars (minor league baseball) players
Cortland Wagonmakers players
Louisville Colonels (minor league) players
Jersey City Skeeters players
Lawrence Colts players
Major League Baseball umpires
19th-century baseball players
Deaths from fire in the United States